Scott Budnick (born October 28, 1971) is an American soccer coach who is currently the head goalkeeping coach at Louisville City FC. Budnick is a retired American soccer goalkeeper who played two seasons in Major League Soccer and one in the USISL.

Player

Youth
Budnick attended the College of William and Mary where he played on the men's soccer team from 1989 to 1993.  During his four-year career with the Tribe, Budnick was a two-time NSCAA All-South Atlantic Region selection and a three-time All-CAA choice. He enjoyed his finest season as a senior in 1992, leading the Tribe to the second round of the NCAA Tournament.  That year, he posted a 0.88 goals against average and seven shutouts. He was named the 1992 William and Mary Tribe Club Senior Male Athlete of the Year.  He graduated with a bachelor's degree in 1993.

Professional
In 1993, Budnick played for the Richmond Kickers in the USISL.  In 1994, he played for the expansion Hampton Roads Hurricanes in 1994.  In 1995, he pursued an overseas career with SSV Vorsfelde in Germany.  In February 1996, the Tampa Bay Mutiny selected Budnick in the 14th round (137th overall) of the 1996 MLS Inaugural Player Draft.  He spent two seasons with the Mutiny, playing thirteen regular season games.  In 1998, the Miami Fusion selected him in the second round of the Expansion Draft.  He played three games in 1998, but spent the entire 1999 season on the injured list.  The Fusion waived him in February 2000 and he was picked up by the New England Revolution, but was released in the pre-season.

International
Budnick played several games with the United States U-20 men's national soccer team in 1989 and 1990 as a backup to Kasey Keller.

Coach
Budnick has worked as an assistant coach with Assumption High School.  In 2009, the Louisville Lightning of the Professional Arena Soccer League hired Budnick as its head coach.  He held the position for one season, winning Coach of the Year honors.  He returned briefly in 2011 to coach the Lightning. Also began coaching at Trinity High School as a goalkeeper coach starting in 2015 and is still coaching there now.

Lawyer
In 2001, he received his M.B.A. from Florida Atlantic University and his J.D. from the Nova Southeastern University in 2004.  He currently works for Dinsmore & Shohl, LLP, in Louisville, Kentucky.

References

External links
 

1971 births
Living people
American soccer coaches
American soccer players
Major League Soccer players
Miami Fusion players
New England Revolution players
Soccer players from Louisville, Kentucky
Richmond Kickers players
Tampa Bay Mutiny players
USISL players
Virginia Beach Mariners players
William & Mary Tribe men's soccer players
Association football goalkeepers
Florida Atlantic University alumni
Nova Southeastern University alumni
High school soccer coaches in the United States
American expatriate soccer players in Germany
Louisville Lightning
Professional Arena Soccer League coaches
Louisville City FC coaches
USL Championship coaches
Association football goalkeeping coaches